The basketball competition at the 1993 European Youth Summer Olympic Days was held from 18 to 20 July. The events took place in Valkenswaard, Netherlands. Boys  born 1978 or 1979 or later participated in the event. No girls event was held.

In terms of medals, the result was an exact repeat of the 1991 competition, with Spain taking gold ahead of Italy, and Greece.

Medal summary

Men

References

Basketball at the European Youth Summer Olympic Festival
Basketball
1993–94 in European basketball
International youth basketball competitions hosted by the Netherlands